Soundtrack of My Life is the fourth solo album by American singer-songwriter Nick Lachey, released on November 11, 2014. The album is a collection of cover versions that were featured on movie soundtracks.

Track listing
In Your Eyes - 4:15
Falling Slowly - 3:21
Here With Me - 4:17
Iris - 3:22
Angel - 3:26
Streets of Philadelphia - 3:43
I Don't Want to Miss a Thing - 3:38
When You Say Nothing at All - 4:06
What a Wonderful World - 3:29
Where Are You, Christmas? - 3:38

References

2014 albums
Nick Lachey albums